The arrondissement of Charolles is an arrondissement of France in the Saône-et-Loire department in the Bourgogne-Franche-Comté region. It has 126 communes.

Composition

The communes of the arrondissement of Charolles, and their INSEE codes, are:
 
 Amanzé (71006)
 Anglure-sous-Dun (71008)
 Anzy-le-Duc (71011)
 Artaix (71012)
 Ballore (71017)
 Baron (71021)
 Baudemont (71022)
 Baugy (71024)
 Beaubery (71025)
 Bois-Sainte-Marie (71041)
 Bourbon-Lancy (71047)
 Bourg-le-Comte (71048)
 Briant (71060)
 Céron (71071)
 Chalmoux (71075)
 Chambilly (71077)
 Champlecy (71082)
 Changy (71086)
 La Chapelle-au-Mans (71088)
 La Chapelle-sous-Dun (71095)
 Charolles (71106)
 Chassigny-sous-Dun (71110)
 Chassy (71111)
 Châteauneuf (71113)
 Châtenay (71116)
 Chauffailles (71120)
 Chenay-le-Châtel (71123)
 La Clayette (71133)
 Clessy (71136)
 Colombier-en-Brionnais (71141)
 Coublanc (71148)
 Cressy-sur-Somme (71152)
 Cronat (71155)
 Curbigny (71160)
 Curdin (71161)
 Cuzy (71166)
 Digoin (71176)
 Dompierre-sous-Sanvignes (71179)
 Dyo (71185)
 Fleury-la-Montagne (71200)
 Fontenay (71203)
 Gibles (71218)
 Gilly-sur-Loire (71220)
 Grandvaux (71224)
 Grury (71227)
 Les Guerreaux (71229)
 Gueugnon (71230)
 Hautefond (71232)
 L'Hôpital-le-Mercier (71233)
 Iguerande (71238)
 Issy-l'Évêque (71239)
 Lesme (71255)
 Ligny-en-Brionnais (71259)
 Lugny-lès-Charolles (71268)
 Mailly (71271)
 Maltat (71273)
 Marcigny (71275)
 Marcilly-la-Gueurce (71276)
 Marly-sous-Issy (71280)
 Marly-sur-Arroux (71281)
 Martigny-le-Comte (71285)
 Melay (71291)
 Mont (71301)
 Montceaux-l'Étoile (71307)
 Montmort (71317)
 Mornay (71323)
 La Motte-Saint-Jean (71325)
 Mussy-sous-Dun (71327)
 Neuvy-Grandchamp (71330)
 Nochize (71331)
 Oudry (71334)
 Ouroux-sous-le-Bois-Sainte-Marie (71335)
 Oyé (71337)
 Ozolles (71339)
 Palinges (71340)
 Paray-le-Monial (71342)
 Perrigny-sur-Loire (71348)
 Poisson (71354)
 Prizy (71361)
 Rigny-sur-Arroux (71370)
 Le Rousset-Marizy (71279)
 Saint-Agnan (71382)
 Saint-Aubin-en-Charollais (71388)
 Saint-Aubin-sur-Loire (71389)
 Saint-Bonnet-de-Cray (71393)
 Saint-Bonnet-de-Joux (71394)
 Saint-Bonnet-de-Vieille-Vigne (71395)
 Saint-Christophe-en-Brionnais (71399)
 Saint-Didier-en-Brionnais (71406)
 Saint-Edmond (71408)
 Sainte-Foy (71415)
 Sainte-Radegonde (71474)
 Saint-Germain-en-Brionnais (71421)
 Saint-Igny-de-Roche (71428)
 Saint-Julien-de-Civry (71433)
 Saint-Julien-de-Jonzy (71434)
 Saint-Laurent-en-Brionnais (71437)
 Saint-Léger-lès-Paray (71439)
 Saint-Martin-de-Lixy (71451)
 Saint-Martin-du-Lac (71453)
 Saint-Maurice-lès-Châteauneuf (71463)
 Saint-Racho (71473)
 Saint-Romain-sous-Versigny (71478)
 Saint-Symphorien-des-Bois (71483)
 Saint-Vincent-Bragny (71490)
 Saint-Yan (71491)
 Sarry (71500)
 Semur-en-Brionnais (71510)
 Suin (71529)
 Tancon (71533)
 Toulon-sur-Arroux (71542)
 Uxeau (71552)
 Vareilles (71553)
 Varenne-Saint-Germain (71557)
 Varenne-l'Arconce (71554)
 Varennes-sous-Dun (71559)
 Vauban (71561)
 Vaudebarrier (71562)
 Vendenesse-lès-Charolles (71564)
 Vendenesse-sur-Arroux (71565)
 Versaugues (71573)
 Vindecy (71581)
 Viry (71586)
 Vitry-en-Charollais (71588)
 Vitry-sur-Loire (71589)
 Volesvres (71590)

History

The arrondissement of Charolles was created in 1800. In January 2017 it gained seven communes from the arrondissement of Autun, and it lost five communes to the arrondissement of Autun, one commune to the arrondissement of Chalon-sur-Saône and 10 communes to the arrondissement of Mâcon.

As a result of the reorganisation of the cantons of France which came into effect in 2015, the borders of the cantons are no longer related to the borders of the arrondissements. The cantons of the arrondissement of Charolles were, as of January 2015:

 Bourbon-Lancy
 Charolles
 Chauffailles
 La Clayette
 Digoin
 Gueugnon
 La Guiche
 Marcigny
 Palinges
 Paray-le-Monial
 Saint-Bonnet-de-Joux
 Semur-en-Brionnais
 Toulon-sur-Arroux

References

Charolles